The following lists events that happened during 1990 in the Union of Soviet Socialist Republics.

Incumbents
President of the Soviet Union – Mikhail Gorbachev
General Secretary of the Communist Party of the Soviet Union – Mikhail Gorbachev
Chairman of the Supreme Soviet – Mikhail Gorbachev (until 15 March), Anatoly Lukyanov (after 15 March)
Vice President of the Soviet Union – Gennady Yanayev 
Premier of the Soviet Union – Nikolai Ryzhkov

Events

January
January 12 – Baku pogrom
January 19–20 – Black January

March
March 4 – 1990 Russian Supreme Soviet election
March 11 – Act of the Re-Establishment of the State of Lithuania

May
May 4 – Declaration "On the Restoration of Independence of the Republic of Latvia"
May 6 – Bridge of Flowers 
May 9 – 1990 Moscow Victory Day Parade
May 16 – Congress of People's Deputies of Russia is established
May 30–31 – 1990 Vrancea earthquakes

June
June 1 – 1990 Chemical Weapons Accord
June 4–6 – Osh riots
June 7–8 – 1990 Local Council of the Russian Orthodox Church
June 12 – Declaration of State Sovereignty of the Russian Soviet Federative Socialist Republic
June 19 – Communist Party of the Russian Soviet Federative Socialist Republic is established

July
Unknown date – Gazprombank was founded.
July 14 – The 28th Politburo of the Communist Party of the Soviet Union is elected
July 14 – Central Committee elected by the 28th Congress of the Communist Party of the Soviet Union
July 16 – Declaration of State Sovereignty of Ukraine
July 27 – Declaration of State Sovereignty of the Belarusian Soviet Socialist Republic

August
August 10 – Tbilisi–Agdam bus bombing
August 30 – The 500 Days program is established

October
October 11 – Declaration of State Sovereignty of Bashkortostan
October 17 – VTB Bank was founded.
October 24 – Soviet nuclear tests
October 27 – Askar Akayev is elected as the 1st President of Kyrgyzstan
October 27 – The first episode of Pole Chudes is presented

Births
September 19 — Evgeny Novikov, Russian rally driver

Deaths
May 15 — Porfiry Krylov, Soviet painter and graphic artist
May 26 — Varlen Pen, Soviet painter
June 1 — Natalia Tkachenko , Soviet painter
June 22 — Marat Podoksin, Soviet painter
July 4 — Pavel Utkin, Soviet painter 
August 2 — Vladilen Nikiforov, Soviet painter 
August 6 — Baqi Urmançe, Tatar-Soviet painter, sculptor, and graphic artist
August 30 — Timofey Ksenofontov, Soviet painter 
October 24 — Boris Maluev, Soviet painter and graphic artist 
November 7 — Stepan Privedentsev, Soviet painter

See also
1990 in fine arts of the Soviet Union
List of Soviet films of 1980-91

References

 
1990s in the Soviet Union
Years in the Soviet Union
Soviet Union
Soviet Union
Soviet Union